Karen Pryor (née Wylie; born May 14, 1932) is an American author who specialized in behavioral psychology and marine mammal biology. She is a founder and proponent of clicker training. 
She was formerly a Marine Mammal Commissioner to the U.S. government.

Personal life
Pryor is the daughter of author Philip Wylie and antiques dealer Sally Ondeck Wylie.

Her uncle was Max Wylie, co-creator of The Flying Nun. Her cousin, Janice Wylie, was murdered in 1963 along with her roommate Emily Hoffert in what became known as the Career Girls Murders.

She was first married to Tap Pryor from 1954 until their divorce in 1975. They had three children: Ted, Michael and Gale. Her second marriage was to Jon Lindbergh, son of aviator Charles Lindbergh and writer Anne Morrow Lindbergh; they divorced in 1997.

Publications

Books:
On My Mind: Reflections on Animal Behavior and Learning - 2014
Reaching The Animal Mind: Clicker Training and What It Teaches Us About All Animals - 2009
 Click to Win: Clicker Training for the Show Ring - 2002
 Dolphin Societies: Discoveries and Puzzles -ed. with Kenneth Norris; University of California Press, 1998
 Don’t Shoot The Dog: The New Art of Teaching and Training - 1984, 1999, 2002, 2006
 A Dog & a Dolphin 2.0: An Introduction To Clicker Training  - 1996
 Getting Started: Clicker Training for Cats - 1999, 2002, 2004
 Getting Started: Clicker Training for Dogs - 1999, 2002, 2005
 Lads Before the Wind - 1975, 1994, 2000 (Harper & Row 1975)
 Nursing Your Baby - 1963, 1973, 1991, 2005 (HarperCollins Publishers 1963)
 On Behavior: Essays and Research - 1994
 Crunch and Des: Classic Stories of Saltwater Fishing - 2002
 How To Teach Your Dog To Play Frisbee - 1985
 Pryor, K. (2014). A dolphin journey.  Aquatic Mammals 40th Anniversary: Special Issue, 104–115.
 Pryor, K. & Chase, S. (2014).  Training for variable and innovative behavior. International Journal of Comparative Psychology, 27, 218-225
 Pryor, K. & Ken Ramirez, K. (2014) Modern Animal Training. In The Wiley-Blackwell Handbook of Operant and Classical Conditioning. McSweeney, F.K and Murphy, E. S. (Eds.).
 Pryor, K.W (2001). Cultural transmission of behavior in animals: How a modern training technology uses spontaneous social imitation in cetaceans and  Behavioral and Brain Sciences, 24, 352-352
 Pryor, K. & Shallenberger, I. (1991). School structure in spotted dolphins (Stenella attenuata) in the tuna purse seine fishery in the Eastern Tropical Pacific. In Dolphin Societies: Discoveries and Puzzles. Pryor, K. & Norris, K.S. (Eds.). Berkeley: University of California Press
 Pryor, K. (1981). Why Porpoise Trainers Are Not Dolphin Lovers: Real and False Communication in the Operant Setting. Annals of the New York Academy of Sciences, 364, 1, 137
 Norris, K.S., Pryor, K. (1970). A Tagging Method for Small Cetaceans. Journal of Mammalogy, 51, 3, 609-610
 Pryor, K.W., Haang, R., & O’Reilly, J. (1969).  The creative porpoise: Training for novel behavior. Journal of the Experimental Analysis of Behavior, 12, 653-661
 Lang, T.G., Pryor, K. (1966). Hydrodynamic Performance of Porpoises (Stenella attenuata). Science, 152, 3721, 531–533.
 Pryor, T., Pryor, K.,&  Norris, S.K. (1965). Observations on a Pygmy Killer Whale (Feresa attenuata Gray) from Hawaii. Journal of Mammalogy, 46, 3, 450–461.

References

External links
 Karen Pryor Clickertraining site
 ClickerExpo - Clicker training conference held by Karen Pryor
 Karen Pryor Academy - The teaching and training school founded by Karen Pryor

21st-century American psychologists
American women psychologists
Behaviourist psychologists
American family and parenting writers
American animal care and training writers
Writers from New York (state)
Cornell University alumni
1932 births
Living people
20th-century American women writers
20th-century American non-fiction writers
21st-century American women writers
American women non-fiction writers
21st-century American non-fiction writers
20th-century American psychologists